Monmouth County, New Jersey, is governed by a Board of County Commissioners, who choose a director from among themselves. Prior to January 1st, 2021 this position was known as the Board of Chosen Freeholders.  

Pursuant to legislation passed in 1709, freeholders sat with the justices of the peace as the Board of Justices and Freeholders; the presiding officer was then known as chairman. Chairmen of the Board of Justices and Freeholders are included here where records are still extant, as well as whether they were a justice or a freeholder. Legislation passed in 1798 separated the freeholders and justices; at that time the Board of Chosen Freeholders was established. Before 1906, Monmouth County Freeholders were elected by townships;  As a result of a 1905 referendum reducing the membership on the board, from 1906 to the present they have been elected at-large. 

On August 21, 2020, "amid a national reckoning to reexamine vestiges of structural racism," Governor Phil Murphy signed a bill to change the name of county governing bodies. Lt. Governor Sheila Oliver, an African-American woman who was once a Freeholder herself, said that the term "refers to a time when only white male landowners could hold public office." The law went into effect on January 1, 2021.

Chairmen of the Board of Justices and Freeholders (1790–1798)

Directors of the Board of Chosen Freeholders (1798–2021)

Directors of the Board of County Commissioners (2021–present)

References

 
Lists of New Jersey politicians